Lục Nam may refer to:

Lục Nam District, a rural district of Bắc Giang Province, Vietnam.
Lục Nam River, a river in Northeast Vietnam, flowing through the province of Lạng Sơn and Bắc Giang.
Former Lục Nam township of Lục Nam District, now part of Đồi Ngô township.